The Mango Aphid, (Toxoptera odinae), is an aphid in the superfamily Aphidoidea in the order Hemiptera. It is a true bug and sucks sap from plants.

References 

 http://animaldiversity.org/accounts/Toxoptera_odinae/classification/
 http://journals.cambridge.org/action/displayAbstract?fromPage=online&aid=2427916
 http://aphid.aphidnet.org/Toxoptera_odinae.php
 http://www.invasive.org/browse/subinfo.cfm?sub=11907
 https://www.researchgate.net/publication/232020288_Identification_occurrence_and_pest_status_of_Toxoptera_odinae_(van_der_Goot)_(Hemiptera_Aphididae)_in_Africa
 http://www.plantwise.org/KnowledgeBank/Datasheet.aspx?dsid=54272

Agricultural pest insects
Aphidini